The DC‐14 Phantom is an American catamaran sailing dinghy that was designed by MacLear & Harris and first built in 1964.

Production
The design was built by Duncan Sutphen Inc. in the United States, but it is now out of production.

Design
The DC‐14 Phantom is a recreational sailboat, with its hulls built predominantly of fiberglass. It has a fractional sloop rig with a rotating mast. The hulls have raked stems, vertical transoms, dual transom-hung, kick-up rudders controlled by a tiller and retractable daggerboards. The boat displaces  and has a central trampoline, stretched over a frame that mounts the hulls.

For transport or storage the hulls can be detached from the trampoline frame.

See also
List of sailing boat types
List of multihulls

Similar sailboats
Phantom 14 - an American lateen-rigged sailboat design, with a similar name
Phantom 14 (catamaran) - an Italian sailboat design, with a similar name
Phantom 16 (catamaran) - an Italian sailboat design, with a similar name
Phantom (dinghy) - a British catboat design, with a similar name

References

Dinghies
Catamarans
1960s sailboat type designs
Sailboat type designs by MacLear & Harris
Sailboat types built by Duncan Sutphen Inc.